The Douglas F4D Skyray (later redesignated F-6 Skyray) is an American carrier-based fighter/interceptor built by the Douglas Aircraft Company. Although it was in service for a relatively short time (1956–1964) and never entered combat, it was the first carrier-launched aircraft to hold the world's absolute speed record, at 752.943 mph, (1211.744 km/h) and was the first United States Navy and United States Marine Corps fighter that could exceed Mach 1 in level flight. It was the last fighter produced by the Douglas Aircraft Company before it merged with McDonnell Aircraft and became McDonnell Douglas. The F5D Skylancer was an advanced development of the F4D Skyray that did not enter service.

Design and development

The Skyray was designed to meet a Navy requirement issued in 1947 for a fighter aircraft that could intercept and destroy an enemy aircraft at an altitude of 50,000 ft (15,240 m) within five minutes of the alarm being sounded. The Navy also wanted an aircraft that followed the designs and research of the German aerodynamicist Alexander Lippisch, who moved to the U.S. after World War II.

The F4D Skyray was a wide delta wing design with long, sharply swept, rounded wings. The design was named for its resemblance to the manta ray. The thick wing roots contained the air intakes feeding a single turbojet engine. Fuel was contained both in the wings and the deep fuselage. Leading edge slats were fitted for increased lift during takeoff and landing, while the trailing edges were mostly elevon control surfaces. Additional pitch trimmers were fitted inboard near the jet exhaust, and were locked upwards on takeoff and landing.

The Westinghouse J40 turbojet was the intended powerplant, but Douglas took a cautious approach, designing in contingency options for other power plants. The J40 proved troublesome and was eventually cancelled, and the Skyray was fitted instead with the Pratt & Whitney J57, a more powerful but larger engine.

Production aircraft were not delivered until early 1956, while the United States Marine Corps received their first in 1957. In total, 419 F4D-1 (later designated F-6 in the unified designation system) aircraft were produced.

Its unique design also played a part in making the Skyray one of the best-known early jet fighters. It was affectionately known as the "Ford" (after the "Four" and "D" of its designation). In 1953, Edward H. Heinemann was awarded the Collier Trophy in recognition of his design work on the F4D.

Operational history

In April 1956, VC-3 was the first squadron operational with the F4D-1. This unit was later redesignated VFAW-3 and assigned to NORAD, as the only United States Navy fighter squadron in what was predominantly a United States Air Force and Royal Canadian Air Force organization. VFAW-3 was permanently based at NAS North Island in San Diego.

The U.S. Marine Corps also flew the Skyray. When the Department of Defense adopted a uniform aircraft designation system patterned on the U.S. Air Force aircraft designation system in September 1962, the F4D was redesignated as the F-6A Skyray. In addition to multiple Navy and Marine Corps squadrons, Naval Air Reserve and Marine Air Reserve squadrons VF-881, VF-882 and VMF-215 also flew the Skyray. The last operational squadron was VMF(AW)-115, which flew the Skyray until February 1964.

The Skyray was designed exclusively for the high-altitude interception role, with a high rate and angle of climb. As a dedicated interceptor, the F4D was unsuited to the multi-mission capabilities soon in demand, so it had a short career in Navy and Marine Corps service, the last aircraft being withdrawn from service in 1964. Four aircraft were used by NACA (soon to be NASA) until 1969.

Under the new 1962 United States Tri-Service aircraft designation system, the F4D-1 was redesignated the F-6A. The F4D (old designation) should not be confused with the F-4D (new designation) – the latter being the "D" variant of the McDonnell Douglas F-4 Phantom II operated by the U.S. Air Force.

F5D Skylancer

The F5D Skylancer was derived from the F4D and intended to be a Mach 2 capable successor to the Skyray. Although four prototypes were built and flown, the project was cancelled as being too similar in mission parameters to the F8U Crusader and also to reduce dependence upon Douglas Aircraft, which was also producing several other aircraft for the U.S. Navy.

Variants

XF4D-1
Prototypes; redesignated YF-6A in 1962, two built

F4D-1
Single-seat fighter aircraft, production model; redesignated F-6A in 1962, 420 built.

F4D-2
Re-engined F4D-1 with the J57-F-14, 100 on order cancelled.

F4D-2N
F4D-2 version with extended nose housing twin radar scanners, project only evolved into the F5D Skylancer.

Operators

 United States Navy
VFAW-3
VF-13
VF-21
VF-23
VF-51
VF-74
VF-101
VF-102
VF-141
VF-162
VF-213
VF-881
VF-882
 United States Marine Corps
VMF-113
VMF-114
VMF-115
VMF-215
VMF-314
VMF-513
VMFA-531
VMF(AW)-542
VX-3
 NACA/NASA

Aircraft on display

XF4D-1
124587 – U.S. Naval Museum of Armament and Technology at Naval Air Weapons Station China Lake, California. It is on loan from the National Naval Aviation Museum, Naval Air Station Pensacola, Florida.

F4D-1 (F-6A)
134748 – Pima Air and Space Museum adjacent to Davis–Monthan Air Force Base in Tucson, Arizona. It is on loan from the National Naval Aviation Museum.
134764 – Naval Air Station Patuxent River in St. Mary's County, Maryland. It is on loan from the National Naval Aviation Museum.
134806 – National Naval Aviation Museum at Naval Air Station Pensacola, Florida.
134836 – Intrepid Sea, Air & Space Museum in New York City. Originally on display at the New England Air Museum before relocating to Intrepid in 2021. 
134936 – Pueblo Weisbrod Aircraft Museum at Pueblo Memorial Airport, Colorado.
134950 – Aviation Heritage Park at Naval Air Station Oceana in Virginia Beach, Virginia.  It is on loan from the National Naval Aviation Museum.
139177 – Flying Leatherneck Aviation Museum at Marine Corps Air Station Miramar in San Diego, California. It is on loan from the National Naval Aviation Museum.

Specifications (F4D-1)

See also

Notes

References
Angelucci, Enzo. The American Fighter. Sparkford, Somerset, UK: Haynes Publishing Group, 1987. .
Francillon, René J. McDonnell Douglas Aircraft since 1920. London: Putnam, 1979. .
Frankel, Mark. Killer Rays: The Story of the Douglas F4D Skyray and F5D Skylancer. North Branch, Minnesota: Specialty Press, 2010. .
Green, William and Gerald Pollinger. The Aircraft of the World. London: Macdonald, 1955.
Gunston, Bill. Fighters of the Fifties. Cambridge, UK: Patrick Stephens Limited, 1981. .
Posey, Carl. "Beautiful Climber". Air & Space, June–July 2006.
Williams, Nick and Steve Ginter. Douglas F4D Skyray, Naval Fighters No. 13. Simi Valley, California: Ginter Books, 1986. .
Winchester, Jim, ed. "Douglas F4D Skyray." Military Aircraft of the Cold War (The Aviation Factfile). London: Grange Books, 2006. .
Winchester, Jim. Fighter: The World's Finest Combat Aircraft, 1913 to the Present Day. New York: Barnes & Noble Publishing, Inc. and Parragon Publishing, 2006. .

Encyclopédie illustrée de l'aviation n°196 - Editions Atlas

External links

Douglas F4D Skyray
Boeing history, F4D
VFAW-3 photos and history

F4D Skyray
Douglas FD4 Skyray
Single-engined jet aircraft
Tailless delta-wing aircraft
Carrier-based aircraft
Mid-wing aircraft
Aircraft first flown in 1951
Second-generation jet fighters